Roslyn Joan Kelly AO (née Raw; born 25 January 1948) is a former member of the Australian House of Representatives, having represented the Division of Canberra from 18 October 1980 to 30 January 1995. She was a minister in the governments of Bob Hawke and Paul Keating.

Early life and ACT politics
Kelly is the daughter of Michael and Patricia Raw.  She studied at the University of Sydney and received a degree in teaching in 1968 and worked as a secondary school teacher from 1969 until 1974. Kelly was elected to the then advisory Australian Capital Territory House of Assembly as a member for Canberra in 1974. She was a member of the assembly until 1979.

Federal politics
Kelly was elected to the House of Representatives in 1980. In 1983, she was the first Australian Federal MP to give birth while in office.  In 1987, she became the first female Labor minister from the House of Representatives, when she was appointed Minister for Defence Science and Personnel.  She subsequently held the portfolios of Communications and Aviation Support 1988–90; Arts, Sport, Environment, Tourism and Territories 1991–93; Environment, Sport and Territories 1993–94; and Arts, Sport, the Environment, Tourism and Territories 1994–95. She also served as Minister Assisting the Prime Minister on the Status of Women until 1994.

She suffered considerable embarrassment as a result of the so-called 'sports rorts affair', when she revealed that funding for sporting bodies was arranged on the basis of a group discussion around a "great big whiteboard" in her office. She resigned from the ministry on 28 February 1994 and from parliament 11 months later on 30 January 1995. The resulting by-election on 25 March 1995 saw the loss of the Canberra electorate to the opposition Liberal Party.

Later life
Since leaving politics, Kelly has worked as an environmental management executive and as a director of a number of non-profit organisations. She is currently chair of the board of trustees for the National Breast Cancer Foundation.

Personal life and honours
Kelly is married to David Morgan, the former CEO of Westpac.   She was formerly married to journalist Paul Kelly, whose surname she has retained.

Kelly was made an Officer (AO) of the Order of Australia in 2004 for service to the community through promoting corporate environmental responsibility and fostering dialogue between business and conservation groups, to the Australian Parliament, and to women's health.

When acting as minister of Arts, Sport, the Environment, Tourism and Territories, Kelly gave support to research at the Riversleigh World Heritage Area and was honoured for this in the naming of a new species Priscileo roskellyae in 1997.

See also
List of the first women holders of political offices in Oceania

References

External links
Caricature by John Henry Spooner
Would it help if I ditched the whiteboard? cartoon by Geoff Pryor

1948 births
Living people
Australian Labor Party members of the Parliament of Australia
Officers of the Order of Australia
Members of the Australian House of Representatives for Canberra
Members of the Australian House of Representatives
Members of the Cabinet of Australia
Women members of the Australian House of Representatives
Members of the Australian Capital Territory House of Assembly
Australian Labor Party members of the Australian Capital Territory House of Assembly
Female defence ministers
Female interior ministers
Keating Government
20th-century Australian politicians
Government ministers of Australia
Women government ministers of Australia
20th-century Australian women politicians